Trichromia cotes is a moth in the family Erebidae. It was described by Herbert Druce in 1896. It is found in Costa Rica and Guatemala.

References

Moths described in 1896
cotes